Chapel Hill is a neighbourhood in the east end Ottawa, Ontario, Canada within the community of Orleans. It is considered an outer-suburb of Ottawa, and before the 2001 amalgamation of the city of Ottawa, it was part of the former City of Gloucester. Chapel Hill consists of mostly single family homes situated next to the National Capital Commission (NCC) Greenbelt and surrounding rural areas. The area is divided into two parts by Innes Road: Chapel Hill North and Chapel Hill South. The northern half is represented by the Chapel Hill North Community Association, while the southern half is represented by the Chapel Hill South Community Association. The boundaries of Chapel Hill North are St. Joseph Blvd (north), Boyer Rd (east), Innes Rd (south) and the greenbelt (west).

According to the 2011 Census, the population of Chapel Hill is 15,917 people, with 7,396 in the south and 8,521 in the north.

Education

French Public
Elementary
École élémentaire publique le Prélude

French Catholic
Elementary
École élémentaire catholique Notre-Dame-des-Champs
Secondary
Collège catholique Mer Bleue

English Public
Elementary
Forest Valley Elementary School

English Catholic
Elementary
Chapel Hill Catholic School

Local Businesses
Dental Clinic
Chapel Hill Dental

Restaurants
Gabriel's Pizza
Louis Pizza Express Orleans

See also
 List of Ottawa neighbourhoods

References

Neighbourhoods in Ottawa